Makhubung is a small suburb along National Road R49 in the country of South Africa, situated near the border of the larger town of Mahikeng.

See also
Economy of South Africa
History of South Africa

References

Populated places in the Mafikeng Local Municipality